"Sammarynda Deep" is a 2008 fantasy short story by Cat Sparks.

Background
"Sammarynda Deep" was first published in 2008 in Paper Cities, edited by Ekaterina Sedia and published by Senses 5 Press. It was featured alongside 20 other stories by the authors Forrest Aguirre, Hal Duncan, Richard Parks, Cat Rambo, Jay Lake, Greg van Eekhout, Steve Berman, Stephanie Campisi, Mark Teppo, Paul Meloy, Vylar Kaftan, Michael Jasper, Ben Peek, Kaaron Warren, Darin C. Bradley, Jenn Reese, David J. Schwartz, Anna Tambour, Barth Anderson, and Catherynne M. Valente. "Sammarynda Deep" won the 2008 Aurealis Award for best fantasy short story and was a short-list nominee for 2009 Ditmar Award for best short story but lost to Margo Lanagan's "The Goosle".

Synopsis

References

2008 short stories
Australian short stories
Fantasy short stories
Aurealis Award-winning works